Kidsbeat  is a Canadian children's television news series that aired on the Global Television Network during the mid-1980s.  

Airing Saturdays at 12:30 p.m. (rebroadcast on TVOntario at 11:30 a.m. on Sundays), the program featured various news stories and specials focusing on issues that mattered to kids.  It also had a strong emphasis on pop culture, including a segment with short clips from the week's top 5 singles, and sometimes featured video games.  It had a variety of different hosts, including, Kevin Newman, Dave Hatch, Pauline Chan, Nerene Virgin, Doug Gamey and Serena Keshavjee amongst others.

1980s Canadian children's television series
Global Television Network original programming
TVO original programming
Television shows filmed in Toronto